Hrvoje Matkovic (born 31 July 1981) in Croatia Vukovar.

Life

In 1991 he fled with his family war torn country of Croatia to Germany Berlin where he started playing for Hertha BSC and showed early signs of Bright Future to follow. in 1993 the family Migrated to Melbourne Australia and he joined St Albans Saints as a junior. Throughout his junior days he had a stint at Dinamo Zagreb juniors and he represented The State of Victoria in National Championship's held in Brisbane. Soon to follow Hrvoje joined Melbourne Knights Football Club and soon after was offered a senior contract where he served for two years in NSL. in 2001 Hrvoje heads to Singapore and spend two years there winning leagues and cups with two biggest clubs Home United and Singapore Armed Forces Football Club. on his Return he joined The Victorian Premier League and played with St Albans Saints Melbourne Knights and Heidelberg Warriors. Hrvoje Sustained a serious knee injury playing for Heidelberg Warriors which ruled him out for year. upon his return from injury he served Werribee City Bees St Albans Saints and finally retired from playing at Strathmore Split where he continued in a coaching role. As a coach he started with two promotions and showed great signs of being an very good coach.

Singapore
Hrvoje Signed under Robert Alberts with Home United of the Singaporean S.League mid-2001,. Hrvoje made an impressive  debut in a 2-1 league win over Balestier Central as a forward left winger assisting Egmar Gonçalves and  Indra Sahdan Daud for the first goal on the 14th minute and constantly posing a threat to the opposition on the left side. Hrvoje was  the brightest young prospect that hit the S-league helping Home united win the Singapore cup with a record win 8–0 against the league winners Geylang United. He also scored an impressive Free kick against Clementi Khalsa with another Australian Grant Barlow in goals  the goal was one of the better ones seen that year.

The Australian has had his bad moments too as he was suspended in a 1–0 victory over Jurong for reciprocating Cobra's defender Imran Mohamed's challenge against him by lashing out with his foot while on the ground.

Following Year declining numerous NSL offers Hrvoje decided to stay in Singapore and sign one-year deal under Fandi Ahmad for  Singapore Armed forces, the youngster linked up with Croatian striker Mirko Grabovac and  Nenad Baćina to help them win the S-league that year unfortunately Hrvoje sustained an injury towards the end of season that  ruled him out and he returned home to Australia.

Coaching 
Hrvoje with the help of his former teammate and Australian Asian Cup Winner Ivan Franjic took over a coaching role as player coach of Strathmore Split in 2016 in State 4 North West Victorian men's competition, the same year he earned a promotion to State 3. Also in 2019 he gained another promotion to State League 2 west Victorian men's league. Currently Hrvoje is still head coach of FC Strathmore Split

References

External links 
 SportsTG Profile
 

Expatriate footballers in Singapore
Association football midfielders
Association football forwards
Association football wingers
Home United FC players
Singapore Premier League players
Australian soccer players
Australian expatriate soccer players
Living people
Heidelberg United FC players
National Soccer League (Australia) players
1981 births
Melbourne Knights FC players
South Melbourne FC players
Preston Lions FC players
St Albans Saints SC players
Australian expatriate sportspeople in Singapore